Pfarrer Braun is a German television series. It is based on the character of Father Brown, originally created by G. K. Chesterton. The last episode of the series (Brauns Heimkehr) was produced in 2013 and aired on March 20, 2014. The reason for discontinuing the series was Ottfried Fischer's (Pfarrer Braun actor) advancing health problems, as the production company announced in May 2013.

Plot 
Pfarrer Guido Braun investigates a case, which usually results in a punitive transfer and thus the establishment of a new plot location for the next episode. If he sees an injustice, he wants to put an end to it, defying the explicit prohibition of his bishop Hemmelrath. In sometimes not entirely kosher ways, he contributes to the solution of the case with the support of his sacristan Armin Knopp, his housekeeper Margot Roßhauptner and the clumsy chief inspector Geiger.

Main Characters 
Pfarrer Guido Braun - despite the explicit prohibition by his bishop Hemmelrath - cannot refrain from taking care of mysterious deaths in his respective parish of service. All too often, however, these turn out to be insidious murders - and because of the public attention they attract, Braun is punitively transferred by his superior to a supposedly quiet neighborhood every two or three episodes or so. While "criminalizing" - as the bishop says - the priest more or less forcibly clashes with the respective police "authority", mostly in the person of the good-natured and slightly simple-minded chief inspector Geiger, who is also frequently transferred due to his "successes", happens to hold seminars on location, takes vacation or has to provide administrative assistance for his colleagues. In the final episode, Braun learns that he is suffering from a terminal illness. After solving the case, he dies during the service in Rome.

Margot Roßhauptner, affectionately called "the Roßhauptnerin" by Braun, is the priest's housekeeper and always comments jauntily on Pfarrer Braun's goings-on (until episode 20). On the one hand, she tries to prevent Braun from criminalizing, because she fears the inevitable transfer and the resulting move, on the other hand, she often supports Braun's criminalizing through undercover activities. A kind of running gag is her risky fast way of driving.

Armin Knopp is the priest's sacristan. In the first episode ("The Seventh Temple"), Braun, as a prison chaplain in a Hamburg prison, is able to exonerate him of unjustified charges and thus obtain his early release on parole from the penal system; from that point on, he is his companion and aide. He falls in love anew in almost every episode, but is always pursued by the misfortune of love. In prison he learned to open any kind of locks, which occasionally helps his parole officer Braun to "criminalize".

Chief Inspector Albin Geiger was punitively transferred to the vicinity of the priest by chance. He is usually ex officio in charge of the criminal cases Braun gets involved in. However, it soon becomes clear why he, too, has to keep changing his place of duty: He acts too stupid for the task assigned to him, a "curse" for the priest. Since the third episode, it can be observed that Braun and Geiger form an alliance of convenience. Braun uses the police capabilities such as personal information, expert opinions or DNA analysis and Geiger uses Braun's capabilities, because the commissioner secretly hopes for a promotion, which he also gets from episode 13 and is promoted to the LKA.

Bishop Sebastian Hemmelrath is Pfarrer Braun's boss. He is God-fearing, but always looking out for the church's (and his own) advantage, though not particularly Bible-believing. While he always forbids the pastor to "criminalize", he likes to bet with him, but when he loses, he tries to get out of his bet. He hopes for an early appointment to Rome, but fails several times for a variety of reasons. In the final episode, he is finally made a cardinal.

Monsignor Anselm Mühlich, the secretary of Bishop Hemmelrath, turns out to be Braun's adversary, trying to intrigue wherever he can - and often getting the short end of the stick. He is also the one who - whenever Hemmelrath and Braun bet on who knows a Bible passage - reveals it to the bishop. Mühlich can also score occasionally against Braun, but ultimately loses. In the episode "Grimms Mördchen," however, Mühlich relies on Braun's criminalistic skills because he fears that he himself will become the victim of an assassination attempt.

Episodes

See also
List of German television series

References

External links
 

Adaptations of works by G. K. Chesterton
German crime television series
2003 German television series debuts
2014 German television series endings
German-language television shows
Das Erste original programming